"Doggone Right" is a 1969 single recorded by The Miracles (aka Smokey Robinson & The Miracles) for the Tamla label. Written by Miracles members Smokey Robinson and Marv Tarplin along with Motown staff songwriter Al Cleveland and produced by Robinson, the single peaked at number 32 on the Billboard Hot 100 in the United States. It was also a Top 10 R&B hit, peaking at #7. 
"Doggone Right" was the A-side to the double-sided Miracles' hit single, Tamla T54183. "Here I Go Again", contrary to popular belief, was the "B" side, although both sides charted within the top 40 of the Hot 100.

Background
Smokey Robinson sings the main lead vocal on the song. Miracles bass singer, Warren "Pete" Moore, has got also a lead on the part where he echos "Doggone right", first sung by the group. The song's lyrics relate that, when the narrator feels down, his girl will cheer him up. The narrator also tells that he would be true to his girl if she would accept his love.

Credits and personnel

The Miracles
 Lead vocals: Smokey Robinson, Pete Moore
 Background vocals: Claudette Robinson, Ronnie White, Bobby Rogers, Pete Moore
 Guitarist: Marv Tarplin
 Other Instrumentation: The Funk Brothers

Chart performance

Television appearances
As befitting an "A" side recording,  The Miracles premiered this song for national television audiences on a 1969 telecast of The Ed Sullivan Show, marking their second appearance on the program.

References

External links
 See The Miracles perform Doggone Right on YouTube

1969 singles
The Miracles songs
Tamla Records singles
Songs written by Al Cleveland
Songs written by Marv Tarplin
Songs written by Smokey Robinson
Song recordings produced by Smokey Robinson
1969 songs